Jahanbani is an Iranian surname. Notable people with the surname include:

 Amanullah Jahanbani (1895–1974), Iranian general
 Khosrow Jahanbani (1941–2014), son of Amanullah
 Nader Jahanbani (1928–1979), Iranian general and fighter pilot, son of Amanullah
 Showkat Malek Jahanbani (1908–?), Iranian educator and politician

Iranian-language surnames